Maureen Cropper is an economist who serves as Distinguished University Professor and Chair of the Economics Department at the University of Maryland. She is a member of the U.S. National Academy of Sciences.

Research 
Her research has focused on estimating the value of health benefits, particularly increases in life expectancy and reductions in the risk of chronic illnesses, that are associated with improvements in air and water quality due to environmental regulations.  She has also studied road safety, assessing how the value of health benefits should vary over the life course, the impact of electric power reforms in India, and the impact of climate change on migration.

Cooper has research affiliations at the National Bureau of Economic Research, the University of Maryland, and Resources for the Future.  She has been an associate editor of the Journal of Environmental Economics and Management, the Journal of Economic Perspectives, Resource and Energy Economics, and the Journal of the Association of Environmental and Resource Economists.  She has been President of the Association of Environmental and Resource Economists, and chaired the Advisory Council on Clean Air Compliance Analysis, Environmental Economics Advisory Committee, and the Advisory Council on Clean Air Compliance Analysis for the U.S. Environmental Protection Agency Science Advisory Board.

Selected works

References 

American women economists
20th-century American economists
21st-century American economists
University of Maryland, College Park faculty
Cornell University alumni
Bryn Mawr College alumni
Living people
Environmental economists
Members of the United States National Academy of Sciences
Year of birth missing (living people)
20th-century American women